Saphenista nauphraga is a species of moth of the family Tortricidae. It is found in Brazil in the Federal District and the states of Rondônia, Santa Catarina and Paraná.

References

Moths described in 1983
Saphenista